Jacobus Johannes Marais (born 5 July 1994) is a South African rugby union player for the  in the Currie Cup and in the Rugby Challenge. His regular position is fly-half.

Rugby career

2007–2012: Schoolboy rugby

Marais was born in Richards Bay in KwaZulu-Natal, but grew up in the Limpopo province, attending primary school in Marble Hall and high school in nearby Groblersdal, earning several call-ups to represent Limpopo at youth rugby union tournaments. He played at the 2007 Under-13 Craven Week in Krugersdorp, kicking fourteen points in four appearances to finish as Limpopo's third top scorer in the tournament.

In 2010, he made two appearances for Limpopo at the Under-16 Grant Khomo Week in Upington, and in 2011, he played at the premier rugby union tournament for high schools in South Africa, the Under-18 Craven Week. He started all three of their matches at the event held in Kimberley, Northern Cape, scoring 51 points, the second-highest by any player in the competition.

He moved to Pretoria to enroll at Hoërskool Waterkloof for 2012, but didn't get any further representative colours at high school level.

2013–2016: Blue Bulls

After high school, Marais joined the academy of the Pretoria-based . In the second half of the season, he reverted to their youth sides, appearing at both Under-19 and Under-21 level. He started off playing in the Under-19 Provincial Championship, but was soon playing in the Under-21 competition, and eventually made six appearances during the round-robin stages of each level. He followed that up by a 15-point haul in the final to help his side to a 35–23 victory to be crowned champions. Marais' total contribution of 126 points ensured he was the top scorer in Group A of the competition, despite missing several matches due to playing at Under-21 level. He also scored 78 points at Under-21 level, to also top-score for his team in the Under-21 competition and finishing fourth on the overall Group A points scoring charts.

In 2014, he returned to play for the Under-21 team, and became a key figure for the team, being named in the matchday squad for all 14 of their matches in the Under-21 Provincial Championship. He made seven starts and five appearances as a replacement during the round-robin part of the season, as his team secure another play-off appearance by finishing the regular season in second place. In addition to winning a title for a second consecutive season, Marais' total points contribution of 138 ensured he finished the competition as the overall top scorer, a single point ahead of Western Province U21s' Robert du Preez.

Marais was once again involved in first class action at the start of 2015, making nine appearances for the Blue Bulls in the Vodacom Cup competition. Marais scored his side's only point in a low-scoring affair, which the team from Cape Town won 10–6 to eliminate the Blue Bulls. Marais scored a total of 85 points throughout the competition, second only to champions the ' JC Roos. He played at Under-21 level for the third successive season, scoring 67 points in his ten appearances during the Under-21 Provincial Championship. However, his side had a disappointing season, with the defending champions failing to qualify for the semi-finals by finishing the season in fifth spot.

2016: Eastern Province Kings

Marais was loaned to the Port Elizabeth-based  for the 2016 Currie Cup Premier Division season. Marais kicked a conversion in that match to end with a points tally of 21 points, second only to De Wet in EP Kings colours. The Kings endured a poor season, losing all eight of their matches in the competition to finish bottom of the log.

2017–present: Pumas

Marais joined the Nelspruit-based  prior to the 2017 season.

References

South African rugby union players
Living people
1994 births
People from uMhlathuze Local Municipality
Rugby union fly-halves
Blue Bulls players
Eastern Province Elephants players
Pumas (Currie Cup) players
Rugby union players from KwaZulu-Natal